The Rare Breeds Survival Trust is a conservation charity whose purpose is to secure the continued existence and viability of the native farm animal genetic resources (FAnGR) of the United Kingdom. It was founded in 1973 by Joe Henson to preserve native breeds; since then, no UK-native breed has become extinct.

It maintains a watch list of rare native breeds of cattle, sheep, pigs, horses, goats and poultry, and an approved list of farm parks.

Projects have included the collection of genetic material to ensure the future of rare breeds in a farm animal "gene bank".  This project received publicity in the wake of the foot-and-mouth disease crisis in the UK and was supported by Charles III (while he was the Prince of Wales). The Trust also supports the Manx Ark Project, which provides sanctuary for rare breeds at several sites in the Isle of Man.

See also

 Genetic diversity
Similar organizations
 The Livestock Conservancy
 Ark of Taste
 Cobthorn Trust
 Gesellschaft zur Erhaltung alter und gefährdeter Haustierrassen

References

External links
 
 

Rare breed conservation
Agricultural organisations based in the United Kingdom
Animal charities based in the United Kingdom
Organisations based in Warwickshire
Environmental organizations established in 1973
1973 establishments in England
1973 establishments in the United Kingdom
Charities based in England
Conservation and environmental foundations